According to myth, Moso's Footprint in Samoa was made when the giant Moso stepped over to Fiji from Samoa, and the other footprint can be found on Viti Levu of Fiji. It is a 2m long depression in basalt.

See also
 Petrosomatoglyph

References

Samoan mythology
Rock formations of Oceania
Landforms of Samoa